The Chersky Range is a mountain range in the Transbaikal Region (Zabaykalsky Krai) of Siberia, Russia. The range rises east of the city of Chita. It is named after explorer Jan Czerski and was formerly known as "Alentuy Range".

Geography
The Chersky Range is part of the South Siberian System. The Ingoda River breaks through the ridge in its central part, along the valley through which a section of the Trans-Siberian Railway crosses the range. 

The relief of the range is characterized by smooth slopes. River Karenga, another tributary of the Vitim, separates the Chersky Range from the Yablonoi Mountains, which run roughly parallel to it.

Flora
The slopes of the range are mainly covered with mountain pine and larch taiga, as well as fir, spruce, dwarf birch and Siberian pine in the deep mountain valleys and on the northern sides.

See also
List of mountains and hills of Russia

References

External links

Mountain ranges of Russia
Landforms of Zabaykalsky Krai
South Siberian Mountains